The high-body pipefish (Leptonotus elevatus) is a pipefish in the family Syngnathidae (seahorses and pipefishes). These demersal fish are widespread in New Zealand and the Auckland Islands. They have been recorded from substrates consisting of bryozoan and coarse shell. The juveniles have been collected in surface plankton tows. They are ovoviviparous and the male bears the eggs in a brood pouch which is on the ventral side of the tail.

References

high-body pipefish
Marine fish of New Zealand
Taxa named by Frederick Hutton (scientist)
high-body pipefish